Gracias por venir, gracias por estar is an Argentine talk show.

Awards

Nominations
 2013 Martín Fierro Awards
 Best general interest

References

Argentine television talk shows
Telefe original programming
2012 Argentine television series debuts